Devadas Kapikad is a Tulu film and theatre actor, director, writer, producer, lyricist and singer. He has also acted in some Kannada films. He owns a drama troupe called  Cha-parka.

Filmography
All films are in Tulu, unless otherwise noted.

Awards
RED FM Tulu Film Awards- Best Dialogue for Telikeda Bolli
Tulu Cinemotsava 2015 award- Best actor in a supporting role for Telikeda Bolli
Tulu Cinemotsava 2015 award- Best Dialogue for Telikeda Bolli
Honorary Doctorate from Mangalore University - 2022

List of Tulu Movies Links
List of tulu films of 2015
List of Tulu films of 2014
List of Released Tulu films
Tulu cinema
 Tulu Movie Actors
 Tulu Movie Actresses
Karnataka State Film Award for Best Regional film
RED FM Tulu Film Awards
Tulu Cinemotsava 2015

References

Devadas Kapikad | Mega Media News
Mangalorean.com - Mangalore News Articles, Classifieds to Around the World

External links

Living people
Tulu people
Male actors in Tulu cinema
Male actors in Kannada cinema
Indian male film actors
Mangaloreans
Male actors from Mangalore
Year of birth missing (living people)
21st-century Indian male actors
Recipients of the Rajyotsava Award 2010